Waubgeshig Isaac Rice is an Anishinaabe writer and journalist from the Wasauksing First Nation near Parry Sound, Ontario, in Canada.  Rice has been recognized for his work throughout Canada, including an appearance at Wordfest's 2018 Indigenous Voices Showcase in Calgary.

Career

Journalism 
Waubgeshig Rice began his journalism career when he spent a year in Germany on a student exchange program, and wrote a series of articles about his experience for the First Nations newspaper Anishinabek News. He graduated from Ryerson University in 2002, and began working as a freelance journalist for media outlets such as The Weather Network and Wasauksing's community radio station CHRZ-FM before joining the CBC's local news bureau in Winnipeg in 2006 and transferring to Ottawa in 2010.

With the CBC, he was a contributor to the radio and television documentary series ReVision Quest and 8th Fire. In 2014, he received the Debwewin Citation for Excellence in First Nations Storytelling from the Union of Ontario Indians. He became the new host of Up North, CBC Radio One's local afternoon show on CBC Northern Ontario, in 2018, and has been heard on the national CBC Radio network as a guest host of Unreserved. He left the CBC in 2020 to concentrate on writing.

Writing 
Rice published the short story collection Midnight Sweatlodge in 2011, as well as the novel Legacy in 2014, with Theytus Books, Ltd. His second novel, Moon of the Crusted Snow, was published in October 2018 by ECW Press, and the audiobook was narrated by actor Billy Merasty and released in December 2018.

The New York Times named Rice, alongside Cherie Dimaline, Rebecca Roanhorse, Darcie Little Badger and Stephen Graham Jones, as "some of the Indigenous novelists reshaping North American science fiction, horror and fantasy."

Podcast 
In 2021 Rice launched the Storykeepers podcast with author Jennifer David, with assistance from an Ontario Arts Council grant. In the podcast Rice and David will be discussing Indigenous literatures, "to bring conversations about Indigenous books to a wider audience in an audio book-club format."

Bibliography

Books 

Drum making : a guide for the Anishinaabe hand drum. Ed. Suzanne Methot. (2005). . Owen Sound, ON: Ningwakwe Learning Press.
Laughter is Good Medicine: Don Burnstick. (2009). . Owen Sound, ON: Ningwakwe Learning Press.
Midnight Sweatlodge. (2011). . Short stories. Penticton, BC: Theytus Books, Ltd.
Legacy. (2014) . Novel. Penticton, BC: Theytus Books, Ltd.
Moon of the Crusted Snow. (2018). . Novel.

Chapters, Forewords, and Translations 

 Brian D. McInnes (2016). Sounding Thunder: The Stories of Francis Pegahmagabow  Foreword by Waubgeshig Rice.
 Ed. Warren Cariou, Katherena Vermette, Niigaan James Sinclair. (2017). Impact: Colonialism in Canada. Manitoba : Manitoba First Nations Education Resource Centre Inc. . "Undercover" (book chapter) by Waubgeshig Rice.
 Le legs d'Eva: roman. tr. Gonny, Marie-Jo. (2017). . Ottawa, ON: Éditions David. Translation of Legacy (2014).
 Wood engravings by Alan Stein. On Spirit Lake: Georgian Bay Stories. (2018). "Manido-gaming" (book chapter) by Waubgeshig Rice. Parry Sound, Ontario: The Church Street Press.
 Ed. Karen Schauber. (2019). The Group of Seven reimagined : contemporary stories inspired by historic Canadian paintings. . Book chapter by Waubgeshig Rice.
 La cérémonie de guérison clandestine. tr. (2019). ASIN : B07NPW68ST. Ottawa, ON: Éditions David. Translation of Midnight Sweatlodge (2011).
 Neige des lunes brisées. tr. (2022). ASIN : 978-2-89712-865-4. Montréal, QC: Mémoires d'encrier. Translation of Moon of the Crusted Snow (2011).

Awards

Independent Publishers Book Award for Midnight Sweatlodge, 2012. Penticton, BC: Theytus Books, Ltd.
 Northern 'lit' Award for Midnight Sweatlodge, 2012. Penticton, BC: Theytus Books, Ltd.
 Debwewin Citation for excellence in First Nation Storytelling, 2004.

References

21st-century Canadian journalists
21st-century Canadian novelists
21st-century Canadian short story writers
21st-century Canadian male writers
21st-century First Nations writers
Canadian male novelists
Canadian male short story writers
Canadian radio journalists
Canadian television reporters and correspondents
Canadian talk radio hosts
Canadian speculative fiction writers
First Nations novelists
First Nations journalists
Ojibwe people
People from Parry Sound District
Writers from Greater Sudbury
Toronto Metropolitan University alumni
Living people
Year of birth missing (living people)
Canadian podcasters